Akhilesh Kumar Singh (15 September 1959 – 20 August 2019) was an Indian politician.

Akhilesh Singh was born on 15 September 1959. Singh was first elected to the Uttar Pradesh Legislative Assembly in 1993 as an Indian National Congress candidate from Rae Bareli Sadar. Singh won reelection twice, in 1996 and 2002, while retaining his affiliation with Congress. Expelled from Congress prior to the 2007 election, Singh ran as a political independent and won a fourth legislative term. Singh contested the 2012 election after joining the Peace Party of India. Upon the completion of his fifth legislative term, Singh's daughter Aditi announced that she would contest her father's open seat in 2017, which she won on Congress ticket.

In later life, Singh was diagnosed with cancer, and died of the disease while seeking treatment at the Sanjay Gandhi Postgraduate Institute of Medical Sciences on 20 August 2019.

References

1959 births
2019 deaths
Indian National Congress politicians from Uttar Pradesh
Uttar Pradesh MLAs 1993–1996
Uttar Pradesh MLAs 1997–2002
Uttar Pradesh MLAs 2002–2007
Uttar Pradesh MLAs 2007–2012
Uttar Pradesh MLAs 2012–2017
Peace Party of India politicians
Deaths from cancer in India
Chhatrapati Shahu Ji Maharaj University alumni